The Far Cry (Portuguese title: Um Divorcio Feliz) is a 1926 American silent epic drama film produced and distributed by the First National Pictures. The film was directed by Silvano Balboni, the husband of writer June Mathis, and starred screen veteran Blanche Sweet. It is based on a 1924 Broadway play of the same name by Arthur Richman. The film is now considered lost.

Cast
Blanche Sweet as Claire Marsh
Jack Mulhall as Dick Clayton
Myrtle Stedman as Louise Marsh
Hobart Bosworth as Julian Marsh
Leo White as Max Fraisier
Julia Swayne Gordon as Helen Clayton
William Austin as Eric Lancefield
John Sainpolis as Count Filippo Sturani 
Dorothy Revier as Yvonne Beaudet
Mathilde Comont as Maid

References

External links

 
 
Lobby poster
 Promotional for director Silvano Balboni
 (The Far Cry clip starts at 0:01)

1926 films
1926 drama films
1926 lost films
Silent American drama films
American silent feature films
American black-and-white films
American epic films
American films based on plays
First National Pictures films
Lost American films
Lost drama films
1920s American films
Silent adventure films
1920s English-language films